Violaine Aernoudts (born 23 October 1999) is a French rower. She competed in the women's quadruple sculls event at the 2020 Summer Olympics.

References

External links
 

1999 births
Living people
French female rowers
Olympic rowers of France
Rowers at the 2020 Summer Olympics